Wachtell, Lipton, Rosen & Katz is an American law firm in New York City. The firm is known for corporate law, regularly handling large and complex transactions. On both a profit per lawyer, and profit per equity partner basis, it is the most profitable law firm in the world.

Timeline
1965 — The firm is founded in New York City.
1970s — Name partner Leonard Rosen participates in securing financing to rescue New York during the 1970s fiscal crisis.
1980 — As part of its growing banking practice, the firm serves 15 lending institutions that loaned money to save Chrysler.
1981 — The firm acts as legal adviser to Curtiss-Wright in Curtiss-Wright Corporation v. Kennecott Corporation.
1982 — Name partner Martin Lipton creates the poison pill defense against tender-based hostile takeovers.
1989 — Name partner George Katz passes away at 57.
2000s — The firm represents the leaseholder of the World Trade Center in trials with its property insurers to secure the funds to rebuild the site after the September 11 attacks.
2000s — The firm represents the United States Department of the Treasury in connection with the rescues of Fannie Mae and Freddie Mac.
2012 — Firm partners help advise Knight Capital Group in securing a $400 million-financing from Jefferies Group, The Blackstone Group, Stifel, etc.
2018 — The firm nabs the top spot among law firms in the United States in profits per partner with a 2018 PPP of $6,530,000.
2019 — The firm secures the top spot as legal adviser for global mergers and acquisitions, based on dollar value, with a combined $585.3 billion in transactions.
2022 — The firm represents Twitter in successfully forcing the completion of a $44 billion dollar takeover by Elon Musk.
2023 — The firm is hired by billionaire Indian industrialist Gautam Adani to represent his business empire against claims made by short seller Hindenburg Research accounting fraud and stock market manipulation on behalf of Adani Group.

History 
The firm was founded in 1965 by Herbert Wachtell and Jerry Kern, who were shortly afterwards joined by Martin Lipton, Leonard Rosen, and George Katz. The four named partners met at New York University School of Law where they were editors on the New York University Law Review together. The firm rose to prominence on Wall Street when many brokers and investment bankers were launching small firms, but received little attention from established white-shoe law firms, such as Sullivan & Cromwell, Simpson Thacher & Bartlett, and Cravath, Swaine & Moore.

One of the founding partners, Martin Lipton, invented the so-called "poison pill defense" during the 1980s, to foil hostile takeovers. Working both sides of mergers and acquisitions, Wachtell Lipton has represented blue-chip clients such as AT&T, Pfizer, and JP Morgan Chase. It has had key roles in the resurrection of Chrysler in the 1970s, the acquisition of Getty Oil by Texaco, and the negotiation of the master development agreement for the World Trade Center after the September 11, 2001 attacks. The firm is also known for its business litigation, and has represented clients in many of the precedent-setting Delaware corporate governance cases.

The firm placed #41 on The American Lawyer's 2021 AmLaw 200 ranking. On the 2021 Global 200 survey, Wachtell Lipton Rosen Katz ranked as the 50th highest grossing law firm in the world.

Profile 
Wachtell, Lipton, Rosen & Katz is considered to be the top firm in the United States for major mergers and acquisitions, antitrust and shareholder litigation and corporate restructurings. While many peer law firms have grown and become international brands, Wachtell has only a single, Manhattan office. It is one of the smallest firms in the AmLaw 100, but has the highest per partner profits of any law firm and pays significantly above the "Cravath scale" market rate for associates. The firm pays its partners through a lockstep system, meaning that compensation is tied to firm seniority, rather than hours billed or business brought in. The same is true for associate bonuses. This compensation model has led to the firm being called the "last true partnership."

The firm is known for its work in mergers and acquisitions and been ranked #1 in Vault's M&A rankings for more than a decade. 

Along with Skadden, Arps, it was also cited in Malcolm Gladwell's Outliers. By the early 1990s, Wachtell was regarded as the "hardest firm in the U.S. to get a job in." As of 2020, the U.S. News & World Report has ranked Wachtell as a tier 1 law firm in national and regional rankings in several practice areas: Banking and Finance Law, Corporate Law, Litigation, and Mergers & Acquisitions.

Notable alumni

William T. Allen, of counsel — former Chancellor of the Delaware Court of Chancery; New York University School of Law professor
Anthony J. Casey, associate — University of Chicago Law School professor 
James Cole, partner — Acting Deputy Secretary of Education
 Allison Christians, associate — H. Heward Stikeman chair in Taxation, McGill University Faculty of Law
 George T. Conway III, associate and partner — lawyer for Paula Jones in sexual harassment lawsuit against President Bill Clinton, founder of The Lincoln Project, husband of Kellyanne Conway
Miguel Estrada — attorney and former judicial nominee
Glenn Greenwald, associate — political activist, journalist, and Pulitzer Prize recipient
 Maura R. Grossman, of counsel — research professor and former director of Women in Computer Science at the University of Waterloo; electronic discovery attorney
Elizabeth Holtzman, associate — former U.S. Representative and Brooklyn District Attorney
Robert J. Jackson Jr., associate — Commissioner of the U.S. Securities and Exchange Commission
David Lat, associate — blogger, Underneath Their Robes and Above the Law
Kenneth K. Lee, associate — judge, United States Court of Appeals for the Ninth Circuit
Matt Levine, associate — attorney, investment banker, and writer
Robert T. Miller, associate — University of Iowa College of Law professor
Robert Morgenthau, of counsel — former New York County District Attorney
Bernard Nussbaum, partner — former White House Counsel to President Bill Clinton
George Postolos, associate — former President and CEO of Houston Rockets
Samuel Rascoff, associate  — New York University School of Law professor
Jed Rubenfeld, associate — Yale Law School professor
Andrew Schlafly, associate — founder of Conservapedia, General Counsel for Association of American Physicians and Surgeons
Richard J. Sullivan, associate — judge, United States Court of Appeals for the Second Circuit
Leo E. Strine, Jr., of counsel – former Chief Justice of the Delaware Supreme Court, Chancellor of the Delaware Court of Chancery; University of Pennsylvania Law School professor
Sheena Wright, associate – former CEO of United Way of New York City, Deputy Mayor of New York City under Eric Adams

See also
List of largest law firms by profits per partner
White shoe firms

References

Law firms based in New York City
Law firms established in 1965
1965 establishments in New York City
Wachtell, Lipton, Rosen & Katz